Lucas Dillon may refer to:

Lucas Dillon (judge) (1530–1593), Irish barrister
Lucas Dillon, 6th Viscount Dillon (??–1682), Irish peer
Lucas Dillon of Loughglynn (1579–1656), Irish politician

See also
Luke Dillon (disambiguation), multiple people